Myennis tricolor is a species of ulidiid or picture-winged fly in the genus Myennis of the family Ulidiidae.

Distribution
Turkmenistan.

References

Ulidiidae
Insects described in 1909
Taxa named by Friedrich Georg Hendel
Diptera of Asia
Endemic fauna of Turkmenistan